Augustin Gérard (2 November 1857 – 2 November 1926) was a French général de division and Grand Master of the Grand Orient de France (1921–22).

Life 
His first important assignment was Chief of Staff of general Joseph Gallieni in Madagascar. In May 1912 he became commander of the 41st Infantry Division and by the outbreak of World War I, he was in charge of the 2nd Army Corps, with which he fought the Battle of the Ardennes and the First Battle of the Marne.

On 24 July 1915, he became commander of the Army Detachment of Lorraine, which was later renamed to Eighth Army. Between 31 March and 31 December 1916 he was in charge of the First Army, after which he returned to the Eighth Army for the rest of the war.

He commanded the eighth Army for an initial period during Allied occupation of the Rhineland until he retired on 21 October 1919. During this period he supported the separatist movement and advocated the formation of an independent Pfalz republic.

Master of the Grand Orient de France in 1921 and 1922.

He died in 1926 and was buried in Les Invalides in Paris.

References 

French generals
1857 births
1926 deaths
French military personnel of World War I
Grand Croix of the Légion d'honneur
French Freemasons